Quasimitra raphaeli is a species of sea snail, a marine gastropod mollusk, in the family Mitridae, the miters or miter snails.

Description
The length of the shell attains 30.6 mm.

Distribution
This species occurs in the Indian Ocean off Réunion.

References

External links
 Drivas, J. & Jay, M. (1990). Descriptions of new mollusks from Reunion Island - II. Cerithidae, Lamellariidae, Buccinidae, Mitridae, and Veneridae. Venus. 49 (4): 271-279
 [https://doi.org/10.1093/zoolinnean/zlx073/4855867 Fedosov A., Puillandre N., Herrmann M., Kantor Yu., Oliverio M., Dgebuadze P., Modica M.V. & Bouchet P. (2018). The collapse of Mitra: molecular systematics and morphology of the Mitridae (Gastropoda: Neogastropoda). Zoological Journal of the Linnean Society. 183(2): 253-337

raphaeli
Gastropods described in 1990